This is a list of George Floyd protests in Iowa, United States.

Locations

Ames
Roughly 300 people gathered the evening of May 30 to march around Ames' City Hall.

Cedar Rapids 
Protesters gathered at the Linn County Courthouse on May 29, 2020.

Davenport 
May 30: More than 500 people in LaClaire Park to protest. Rocks were thrown during part of the protest. May 31: Dozens of shots were fired all over the city. At midnight, a 22-year-old female protester was shot in the back and died. A police officer injured in a drive-by shooting was recovering and in "good spirits." On June 1, at around 3:00 a.m., three Davenport police officers were ambushed by gunfire while on patrol. Two of the officers were injured while the third returned fire.

Decorah 
About 200 people gathered on Water Street on the afternoon of May 31 to protest.

Des Moines 

Hundreds of protesters clashed with police outside of the city's police headquarters on May 29. Some protesters threw bottles, rocks, bricks, and fire crackers at officers and windows were smashed at nearby buildings in the city's East Village neighborhood. Tear gas and pepper spray were used. A protest and march on May 30 spilled to Iowa State Capitol steps and the city's Court Avenue entertainment district, where windows were broken at the Polk County Courthouse and several businesses were vandalized.

Dubuque 
About 100 protesters lay on the ground to honor George Floyd in Jackson Park on June 1. Speakers included the President of the Dubuque chapter of the NAACP and a woman who sued the city for injuring her with a Taser in 2019.

Iowa City 

Hundreds protested the afternoon of May 30 at the Pentacrest on the University of Iowa campus. Streets were blocked to allow protesters to maintain social distance due to the COVID-19 pandemic.

Mason City 
On May 31, about 30 people held signs along North Washington Street near Central Park around 9:30 p.m.

Ottumwa 
On June 5, over 100 protesters rallied in Central Park and marched through downtown.

Sioux City 
On May 29, about 100 protesters marched to the Sioux City Police/Fire Headquarters building. June 5: Hundreds gathered at 3pm for a protest at Cook Park.

Waterloo 
Approximately 500 people marched from Veteran's Memorial Park to Lincoln Park on May 29.

References 

2020 in Iowa
Events in Iowa
Iowa
Riots and civil disorder in Iowa
May 2020 events in the United States
June 2020 events in the United States